Music quota refers to policy that enforces minimum airtime of domestic songs for a certain period to protect the local music industry.

Australia
The Australian music quota imposed on domestic radio stations depends on how it its classified by the Australian Communications and Media Authority (Acma).

France
A 1994 law in France requires a minimum of four in ten songs broadcast by domestic radio stations to be in the French language.

Germany
There is no legislation in Germany mandating a radio quota but there has been efforts to introduced one since the mid-1990s.

Ireland
There is no radio quota in place in Ireland where music created in Ireland is played once to every six plays for international artists as of 2020. A bill filed in the Dáil Éireann proposing to impose 40% radio quota for Irish music was defeated in 2016.

Philippines
Under Executive Order No. 255 issued by President Corazon Aquino in 1987, radio stations with musical format programs in the Philippines are required to broadcast a minimum of four Original Pilipino Music compositions every clockhour.

See also
Screen quotas

References

Quotas
Radio broadcasting